Spring Street (Chinese: 史必灵路) is a one-way street in Chinatown within the Outram Planning Area of Singapore. The street links Neil Road to Banda Street and is mainly used during the Chinese New Year festive season as part of the Chinatown night bazaar.

References
Victor R Savage, Brenda S A Yeoh (2004), Toponymics - A Study of Singapore Street Names, Eastern University Press, 

Roads in Singapore
Outram, Singapore
Chinatown, Singapore